Williams Cliff is a prominent rock cliff that stands out from the ice-covered southwest slopes of Mount Erebus, situated 6 nautical miles (11 km) east of Cape Barne on Ross Island. This rock cliff was mapped by the British Antarctic Expedition under Scott, 1910–13, and identified simply as "Bold Cliff" on maps resulting from that expedition. It was named Williams Cliff by the Advisory Committee on Antarctic Names (US-ACAN) in 1964 to commemorate Richard T. Williams, who lost his life when his tractor broke through the ice at McMurdo Sound in January 1956.

Cliffs of Ross Island